Inversin is a protein that in humans is encoded by the INVS gene.

This gene encodes a protein containing multiple ankyrin domains and two IQ calmodulin-binding domains. The encoded protein may function in renal tubular development and function, and in left-right axis determination. This protein interacts with nephrocystin and infers a connection between primary cilia function and left-right axis determination. A similar protein in mice interacts with calmodulin. Mutations in this gene have been associated with nephronophthisis type 2. Two transcript variants encoding distinct isoforms have been identified for this gene.

Interactions
INVS has been shown to interact with NPHP1.

References

Further reading